Dewey Sullivan (May 6, 1935 – November 8, 2006) was an American high school football coach who coached more than 40 years at Dayton High School in Dayton, Oregon. A member of the Oregon Sports Hall of Fame.

Early years
Sullivan was born in Geary, Oklahoma and graduated from Western State College in Gunnison, Colorado in 1959.

Coaching career
Sullivan began coaching at Dayton in 1965 and remained until his death in 2006. During his tenure, the team won five state titles and appeared in the playoffs 25 consecutive times. Sullivan won Oregon Coach of the Year honors 24 times, and was named the National High School Coach of the Year by the National Association of Interscholastic Coaches in 2001. With an overall record of 352–84–2, Sullivan is the winningest high school football coach in Oregon history and ranks among the top 20 in the United States.
Book written about his life "A Barefoot Boy From Oklahoma: The Dewey Sullivan Story" by his wife Vera Sullivan,  available on Amazon.

Sullivan died of complications from pneumonia in 2006. He was named to the Oregon Sports Hall of Fame the following year.

References

1935 births
2006 deaths
People from Geary, Oklahoma
Western Colorado University alumni
People from Dayton, Oregon
High school football coaches in Oregon